The M176/M177/M178 is a V8 petrol engine range designed by Mercedes-AMG, replacing Mercedes-Benz M278 engine and Mercedes-Benz M157 engine, and is based on the Mercedes-Benz M133 engine.

The engine has two BorgWarner turbochargers positioned between the two cylinder heads in a "hot-V" configuration. The fuel injection system uses Bosch's new piezo-electric direct fuel injectors that deliver five squirts of fuel per combustion cycle.

The M176 engines are mostly assembled by machine with some components assembled by technicians at Untertürkheim manufacturing centre outside Stuttgart. The M177 and M178 are individually assembled by the technicians in "one man, one engine" principle at AMG manufacturing centre in Affalterbach.

M176 
The M176 version debuted in 2015 for the Mercedes-Benz G 500/G 550 and G 500 4x42. This mild hybrid system was fitted to GLE 580 4MATIC and GLS 580 4MATIC. The M176 engine with EQ Boost has been upgraded in 2021 for S 580 4MATIC with increased output for petrol engine and decreased output for EQ Boost.

Applications

M177 
The M177 was the first variation released in the Mercedes-AMG C63. In contrast to the M178, this version of the engine uses wet-sump lubrication. In the C63 and GLC63 applications, the turbos are single-scrolled, whereas in E63 and S63 are twin-scrolled and different exhaust manifold. The twin-scroll application also features cylinder deactivation.

As part of the agreement with Mercedes-AMG since 2013, Aston Martin installs the M177 engines in DB11 V8 and DB11 Volante(2017–), Vantage (2018–), and DBX (2021–).

In late 2019, the 48V system used in the M176 was added to the M177 engines for extra performance, improved fuel consumption, and reduced emission output.

Applications

M178 
The M178 is the second variation in the family, geared toward higher performance and motorsport. The  versions were introduced in Mercedes-AMG GT (C190). The power has been upgraded several times. Brabus offers PowerXtra B40S-800, a performance upgrade kit for AMG GT.

Specifications 
Cylinder arrangement V8
Cylinder angle 90°
Cylinder block alloy Cast aluminium, closed deck
Cylinder head alloy Cast aluminium, zirconium alloy
Valves per cylinder 4 (DOHC)
Variable valve timing Camshaft adjustment on both the inlet and outlet side
Displacement 
Bore x stroke 
Cylinder spacing 
Compression ratio 10.5:1
Output  at 6,250 rpm [Output per litre ]
Maximum torque  at 1750 – 4750 rpm [Torque per litre ]
Maximum engine speed 7,200 rpm
Maximum charge pressure 
Peak engine pressure 
Air delivery Forced induction, 2x twin scroll turbochargers spinning to 186,000 rpm with electronically controlled blow-off valves
Fuel delivery Electronically controlled direct petrol injection with spray-guided combustion, fully variable, fuel pressure 
Coolant delivery 3 phase thermostat, timing chain driven water pump rated  /min flow
Oil delivery  oil, dry-sump, via two-stage controlled suction pump ( /min), a pressure pump and a  external oil tank
Oil cooling External engine oil cooler in the front
Engine weight (dry) 
Emissions standard Euro 6
NEDC combined consumption Under  /

Applications

See also 
List of Mercedes-Benz engines

References 

Mercedes-Benz engines
V8 engines
Gasoline engines by model